The Moore method is a deductive manner of instruction used in advanced mathematics courses. It is named after Robert Lee Moore, a famous topologist who first used a stronger version of the method at the University of Pennsylvania when he began teaching there in 1911. (Zitarelli, 2004)

The way the course is conducted varies from instructor to instructor, but the content of the course is usually presented in whole or in part by the students themselves. Instead of using a textbook, the students are given a list of definitions and, based on these, theorems which they are to prove and present in class, leading them through the subject material. The Moore method typically limits the amount of material that a class is able to cover, but its advocates claim that it induces a depth of understanding that listening to lectures cannot give.

The original method

F. Burton Jones, a student of Moore and a practitioner of his method, described it as follows:

The students were forbidden to read any book or article about the subject. They were even forbidden to talk about it outside of class.  Hersh and John-Steiner (1977) claim that, "this method is reminiscent of a well-known, old method of teaching swimming called 'sink or swim' ".

Quotations
"That student is taught the best who is told the least." Moore, quote in Parker (2005: vii).
"I hear, I forget. I see, I remember. I do, I understand." (Chinese proverb that was a favorite of Moore's. Quoted in Halmos, P.R. (1985) I want to be a mathematician: an automathography. Springer-Verlag: 258)

References

Chalice, Donald R.,  1995, "How to teach a class by the Modified Moore Method." American Mathematical Monthly 102:  317-321.
 Cohen, David W., 1982, "A modified Moore method for teaching undergraduate mathematics", American Mathematical Monthly 89(7): 473-474,487-490.
Hersh, Reuben and John-Steiner, Vera, 1977, "Loving + Hating Mathematics". 
Jones, F. Burton, 1977, "The Moore method," American Mathematical Monthly 84: 273-77.
Parker, John, 2005. R. L. Moore: Mathematician and Teacher. Mathematical Association of America. .
Wall, H. S. Creative Mathematics. University of Texas Press. .
Zitarelli, David, 2004. The Origin and Early Impact of the Moore Method", American Mathematical Monthly 111: 465-486.

External links
The Legacy of Robert Lee Moore Project.
Links to biographical material and the Moore method.

Mathematics education